Dr. Robotnik's Mean Bean Machine is a falling block puzzle game developed by Compile and published by Sega. It was released for the Sega Genesis / Mega Drive in North America and Europe in November 1993, and ported to the Game Gear in 1993 and Master System in 1994.

The game is a Westernised version of Puyo Puyo (1991), and replaces its characters with those from the Sonic the Hedgehog franchise, primarily the Adventures of Sonic the Hedgehog animated series. The Puyo Puyo character Carbuncle appears under the name "Has Bean" and makes different animations depending on how the player plays the game. The gameplay is similar to puzzle games such as Tetris, in which the player organises coloured shapes as they descend a board. The plot sees Sonic antagonist Doctor Robotnik kidnapping residents from Beanville and turning them into robots. The game received generally positive reviews, with critics praising the gameplay but criticising the difficulty.

Premise and gameplay

The game is set on the planet Mobius, which is inhabited by bean-like creatures. Doctor Robotnik conceives a plan to bring terror to the world by kidnapping the citizens of Beanville and turning them into robot slaves, and eventually creating an army that will help him rid the planet of fun and joy. To achieve this, he creates the "Mean Bean-Steaming Machine" in order to transform the bean-like creatures into robots. Putting his plan into motion, Robotnik sends out his Henchbots to gather all the bean-like creatures and group them together in dark dungeons so they can be sent to the Mean Bean-Steaming Machine. The rest of the game's story revolves around the player character, "Has Bean", and their journey to stop Robotnik's henchmen by breaking into the dungeons and freeing the bean-like creatures.

Dr. Robotnik's Mean Bean Machine is based on Puyo Puyo, a Japanese falling-block puzzle game. In the story, players must rescue Beanville from Dr. Robotnik and his army of Badniks. In Scenario Mode, the player plays against 13 increasingly challenging computer opponents. In the multiplayer 1P vs 2P Mode, two players battle against each other, and in Exercise Mode, players can simply practice. The Game Gear and Master System versions feature an additional mode, Puzzle Mode, in which players must attempt to clear predetermined sets of beans. On each player's grid, groups of beans fall from the top of the screen and can be moved and rotated until they reach the bottom. When four beans of the same colour are matched together, they disappear from the grid, causing any beans above to drop. These beans can trigger other matches, resulting in chain combos. By performing chain combos, players can send grey "refugee beans" to hinder their opponent. These beans cannot be matched normally and can only be removed by completing a match adjacent to them. A player loses when beans spill over the top of the board, leaving them unable to add more.

Development and release
Dr. Robotnik's Mean Bean Machine is a Westernised version of Puyo Puyo (1991), a Japanese falling-block puzzle game developed by Compile and released for the MSX2 in 1991. Fearing that the game would not be popular with the Western audience, Sega replaced the characters of Puyo Puyo with those from the Sonic the Hedgehog franchise, particularly those from the 1993 Adventures of Sonic the Hedgehog animated series. The game was ultimately released in November 1993 in North America and Europe. An 8-bit version was also released for the Game Gear in the same year and the Master System in the following year, adapted from the Japanese Nazo Puyo game.

Dr. Robotnik's Mean Bean Machine has also appeared in retrospective compilations, such as the Sonic Mega Collection for the GameCube in 2002, Sonic Mega Collection Plus for the PlayStation 2 and Xbox in 2004; which also contains the Game Gear version, and Sonic's Ultimate Genesis Collection (known as Sega Mega Drive Ultimate Collection in Europe) for PlayStation 3 and Xbox 360 in 2009. In 2006, Sega released the game on the Wii's Virtual Console. In 2010, it was released on Microsoft Windows via Steam. In June 2013, it was released for the Nintendo 3DS via its Virtual Console emulation service. In 2021, it was released on the Nintendo Switch Online + Expansion Pack.

Reception

Dr. Robotnik's Mean Bean Machine received generally positive reviews. It holds an average score of 75% at GameRankings, based on an aggregate of five reviews.

Critics praised the various aspects of gameplay, although the puzzle genre's difficulty and overuse were negative factors. Andy Dyer from Mega acknowledged that the game had a simple concept and also observed that it did not provide enough of a challenge. Lucas Thomas of IGN enjoyed the game's array of puzzles and recognised that its design was intended to encourage two-player competition. Reviewing the Mega Drive version, Damien McFerran of Nintendo Life similarly echoed Thomas' opinion of the game's intention to encourage two-player competition, and also noted that it provided a "decent" challenge despite viewing that a single player could get bored easily. In contrast, Andrew Webster of Gamezebo criticised the high level of difficulty and the game's general accessibility due to its "ancient" password save system. Aaron Thomas of GameSpot found the game difficult to recommend due to the availability of free Puyo Puyo clones on the PC, but commended its basic mechanics, a wide range of game modes, and gradually increasing difficulty. Eurogamer Kristan Reed labelled the game as a "fairly unapologetic reskin" of Puyo Puyo and thought that Sega decided to "shoehorn" it into the Sonic the Hedgehog franchise in order to enhance their sales, although Reed admitted the gameplay was solid and addictive. A reviewer from Jeuxvideo.com questioned the game's originality, saying that "stacking beans to make them disappear is not a new concept" but would still satisfy fans of the genre. Amanda Tipping from Computer and Video Games thought that the game was as addictive and as puzzling as the Tetris series, and also preferred the game's colourful visuals as opposed to Tetris. GamePro reviewer Andromeda found the game most enjoyable when using an offensive strategy.

The Game Gear version was well received. In a retrospective review, Ron DelVillano from Nintendo Life praised the game's wide variety of game modes but noted the soundtrack's lack of diversity. DelVillano also thought that the graphics had not aged well as of 2013, but accepted that games in the puzzle genre did not require prominent visuals. In a similar vein, a reviewer from  opined that the game's graphics were not "a joy" to look at, but understood that it was "normal" for a game of that genre. Neal Ronaghan of Nintendo World Report lauded the game's addictive and "fun" puzzle gameplay but admitted it contained flaws due to the limitations of the Game Gear. In 1995, MegaZone included the game in their "Top 50 Games In History".

References
Citations

Bibliography

Notes

External links
 

1993 video games
Compile (company) games
Game Gear games
Puyo Puyo
Sega video games
Master System games
Sega Genesis games
Virtual Console games
Video games based on animated television series
Multiplayer and single-player video games
Windows games
Sonic the Hedgehog spin-off games
Nintendo Switch Online games
Virtual Console games for Nintendo 3DS
Video games developed in Japan